Aidan Eames is an Irish solicitor and former politician. He briefly served as a Fianna Fáil member of the 16th Seanad. He was nominated by the Taoiseach Charles Haughey, on 13 December 1982, to fill a vacancy after the November 1982 general election. He did not contest the 1983 Seanad election.

He is a practising solicitor in the firm of Eames and Company. He was a director of Bord Gáis from 2004 until 2014. He was a non-executive director at Irish Bank Resolution Corporation from May 2010 to February 2013.

References

Year of birth missing (living people)
Living people
Fianna Fáil senators
Irish solicitors
Members of the 16th Seanad
People from County Sligo
Nominated members of Seanad Éireann